Dicte (broadcast in the UK as Dicte – Crime Reporter) is a Danish series starring Iben Hjejle as crime reporter Dicte Svendsen, who has returned to her hometown of Aarhus following a divorce. The series is based on Danish author Elsebeth Egholm's series of novels about the title character. It is broadcast in Denmark on TV2 Danmark.

Season 1 was broadcast in Denmark in 2013, season 2 in 2014, and season 3 in 2016. In the UK the first season was broadcast on More4 in mid-2016 as five feature-length episodes under the title Dicte - Crime Reporter, followed by the second season in mid-2017, and the third starting July 2018. All three seasons are available on Netflix (US) since November 2016.

Cast and characters

Episodes

Season 1

Season 2

Season 3

Early reception 
1.32 million viewers tuned into the first season's premiere in Denmark. While reviews were mixed, Hjejle received good reviews for her performance. Some critics complained that most of the actors' Copenhagen accents were not authentic for a show set in Aarhus, while other actors' accents were so overblown they seemed caricatures.

References

External links
 
 

2010s Danish television series
Danish drama television series
Danish crime television series
2013 Danish television series debuts
Danish-language television shows
TV 2 (Denmark) original programming